Kapak may refer to:
 Kapak, Kurdistan
 Kapak, Sistan and Baluchestan